John J. Brennan (1901 – 6 August 1977) was a draper and publican, a Fianna Fáil politician and a member of Seanad Éireann from 1960 to 1977.

He was from Clontibret in County Monaghan and was active in the Old IRA during the Irish War of Independence. He was elected to the County Council in 1942.  In Castleblayney, he was chair of the urban district council and president of the chamber of commerce. He stood unsuccessfully for Dáil Éireann in Monaghan in the elections of 1948, 1954, and 1957.  He was a friend and early political backer of Erskine H. Childers, Monaghan TD and later President of Ireland.

He was elected to the 9th Seanad on 9 February 1960 at a by-election to the Administrative Panel caused by the death of John O'Leary. He was elected to the 11th (1965) and 13th (1973) Seanad from the Industrial and Commercial Panel, and was nominated by the Taoiseach to the 10th Seanad in 1961 and to the 12th Seanad in 1969.

References

1901 births
1977 deaths
Fianna Fáil senators
Local councillors in County Monaghan
Members of the 9th Seanad
Members of the 10th Seanad
Members of the 11th Seanad
Members of the 12th Seanad
Members of the 13th Seanad
Irish Republican Army (1919–1922) members
Nominated members of Seanad Éireann